The Small Basilica of Philippopolis (Malka bazilika na Filipopol) is one of Plovdiv's most distinctive landmarks. The basilica is located on Maria Louisa Blvd in the central part of Bulgaria's second-largest city. The ruins of the early Christian church were found during construction works in the area in 1988. The three-nave basilica is an example of the exceptional skill of mosaic builders in ancient Philippopolis.

The basilica 
The basilica was built in the second half of the 5th century AD and contained rich architectural decoration including a marble colonnade between the naves, a marble altar screen, a pulpit, and a synthronon in the altar apse. The total length of the building is 20 m and its width is 13 m. Originally, it was built as a three-nave basilica with one apse and a narthex. The floors are covered with colorful Roman mosaics with geometrical motifs. A small chapel is built against the south end of the basilica and a baptistery is attached to the northern part of the building. The total length of the church is 20 m and its width is 13 m. The baptistery has a square plan, and contains a cruciform baptizing pool and polychromatic mosaics. Deers, pigeons, and other Christian symbols were depicted on them.

Excavation and restoration 
 1988 - The ruins of the early Christian basilica were accidentally discovered during the construction of an apartment block in the area.
 1993-1994 -  A team from the National Monuments of Culture Institute removed and put in storage about half of the mosaics, leaving and conserving the rest in situ.
 1995 - The basilica and the adjacent remains of ancient fortification wall were declared a national monument of culture.
 2000 - Some of the mosaics were restored by the archeologist Mina Bospachieva and the restorationist Elena Kantareva-Decheva.
 2010 - A thorough conservation and restoration project was initiated with the financial support of the America for Bulgaria Foundation, the Ministry of Culture of the Republic of Bulgaria, and the Plovdiv Municipality.
 2013 - The restored small basilica was inaugurated.
 2014 - The small basilica opened to the public on 1 May.

Gallery

External links 
 Ancient Stadium of Philippopolis - Map of Ancient Philippopolis
 Roman Plovdiv - The Small Basilica
 Visit Plovdiv - The Small Basilica

Archaeological sites in Bulgaria
Ancient Roman buildings and structures in Bulgaria
Churches in Plovdiv
5th-century churches
Philippopolis (Thrace)